Harold F. French (born November 5, 1955) is an American politician and a Republican member of the New Hampshire Senate who represented the 7th district between 2016 and 2022.

French attended Plymouth State University. French was elected to the New Hampshire Senate in 2016, defeating incumbent Democrat Andrew Hosmer. From 2014 to 2016 French was a member of the New Hampshire House of Representatives.

Electoral history

References

External links
Official page at the New Hampshire Legislature

Harold French at Ballotpedia

Living people
People from Franklin, New Hampshire
American auctioneers
American real estate brokers
Republican Party members of the New Hampshire House of Representatives
Republican Party New Hampshire state senators
21st-century American politicians
1955 births